Mojuí dos Campos is a municipality in the state of Pará in the Northern region of Brazil. The city had already emancipated from Santarém in 2006, but since that date no municipal elections were run in the city until the 2012 one.

See also
List of municipalities in Pará

References 

Municipalities in Pará
Populated places established in 1999
1999 establishments in Brazil